Mikk is an Estonian masculine given name, a version of Nicholas.

People named Mikk include:
Mikk-Mihkel Arro (born 1984), decathlete
Mikk Jürjens (born 1987), actor, singer and TV presenter
Mikk Jurkatamm (born 2000), basketball player
Mikk Mikiver (1937–2006), actor and theater director
Mikk Murdvee (born 1980), Estonian-Finnish conductor and violinist
Mikk Pahapill (born 1983), decathlete
Mikk Pinnonen (born 1991), handballer
Mikk Reintam (born 1990), football player

See also
Mikko
Miki, Azerbaijan, village and municipality in the Astara Rayon of Azerbaijan, also known as Mikk.

References

Estonian masculine given names